Jens Arnold Diderich Jensen (24 July 1849, in Flensburg – 24 November 1936, in Copenhagen) was a Danish naval officer and Arctic explorer.

Career
Jensen assisted the geological exploration along the Greenland west coast. He is particularly renowned for his explorations of the inland ice sheet. He led an expedition that discovered the nunataks now named J. A. D. Jensen Nunataks (J. A. D. Jensens Nunatakker) after him.  The geologist of the expedition, A. Kornerup, collected no less than 27 species of Angiosperms on the nunataks. Cape J.A.D. Jensen and the J.A.D. Jensen Fjord are also named after him.

In 1911, he changed his name to Jens Arnold Diderich Jensen Bildsøe.

Works
 Indlandsisen, 1888.
 Grundrids af Læren om Ebbe og Flod, 1899.
 Lærebog i Navigation, I-II, 1903–04, 2nd edition 1914–19.
 Kortfattet Navigationslære, 1908, 4th edition 1929.
 Danske Søfartslove i Uddrag (1908, 3d edition 1927)
 Nautisk Almanak, 1891.
 Contribution to Meddelelser om Grønland

See also 
Cartographic expeditions to Greenland
List of Arctic expeditions

References

19th-century Danish naval officers
20th-century Danish naval officers
Explorers of the Arctic
Danish polar explorers
1849 births
1936 deaths
People from Flensburg